The 2016–17 season was Genoa Cricket and Football Club's tenth consecutive season in Serie A.

Season review

The club competed in Serie A, finishing 16th after a poor league campaign, and in the Coppa Italia, where they were eliminated in the round of 16.

Players

Squad information

Transfers

In

Loans in

Out

Loans out

Pre-season and friendlies

Competitions

Overall

Last updated: 28 May 2017

Serie A

League table

Results summary

Results by round

Matches

Coppa Italia

Statistics

Appearances and goals

|-
! colspan=14 style=background:#DCDCDC; text-align:center| Goalkeepers

|-
! colspan=14 style=background:#DCDCDC; text-align:center| Defenders

|-
! colspan=14 style=background:#DCDCDC; text-align:center| Midfielders

|-
! colspan=14 style=background:#DCDCDC; text-align:center| Forwards

|-
! colspan=14 style=background:#DCDCDC; text-align:center| Players transferred out during the season

Goalscorers

Last updated: 23 April 2017

Clean sheets

Last updated: 23 April 2017

Disciplinary record

Last updated: 23 April 2017

References

Genoa C.F.C. seasons
Genoa